Jillian Armsbury was a singer, performer, songwriter and occasional activist, originally from Washington state. She was a pioneer in the Charanga R&B music genre. She was the lead singer of the Latin group Los Jovenes del Barrio. She had worked with the latin jazz percussionist, Mongo Santamaria, singing on an album of his which was released in the late 1980s. She was the co-composer of "Do You Want My Love" which was a hit for CoCo Lee, which appeared on Lee's album Just No Other Way. She was married to bandleader Johnny Almendra and then later session musician Leon Pendarvis.

Background
Armsbury was born and raised in Washington State and Oregon and was of German, English, and Scottish ancestry. Her father married a black woman when she was three, so her family was also black. At the age of nine she was doing community theater. A formally trained dancer, she studied dance for some years. Later wanting to do New York Broadway work she realized that dancers were also singing so that led her to study music and singing. She grew up listening to Aretha Franklin, Otis Redding, James Brown, John Coltrane and Motown.

Armsbury was married to Johnny Almendra who founded Los Jovenes Del Barrio. At the time of their interview with George Rivera of Jazz Con Clave, they had been together for ten years. She was also married to Saturday Night Live music director Leon Pendarvis, who she remained married to until her death.

Career
An article by Jessica Lynne Valiente of the Graduate Center, City University of New York credits Armsbury with the compositions that she contributed, and the artistic persona in her performances for creating a Latin / R&B fusion that was more successful than anything that had ever been tried during the boogaloo era or following it. The group Los Jovenes del Barrio she was in was one of the most important bands in the New York bands in the New York Latin music scene, pushing the barriers as well as extending the musical shape.

1980s - 1990s
Armsbury appeared on the Olé Ola album by Mongo Santamaria which was released in 1989. She sang lead on the title song", the Diane Bulgarelli composition Olé Ola" as well having some involvement with Santamaria's composition "La Tumba".
In 1996, Los Jovenes Del Barrio released their Evolucionando album. The Billboard reviewer noted her shining performances on the songs "Telephone" and "Stop Slow Down". A similar review was given by Cashbox in the February 10th issue. With the group's experimentation with various Afro-Cuban styles, jazz and R&B, it caused a sensation. In May 1998, along with Baby Zilla, she was appearing at the Downtime in New York.
She co-composed the song "Do You Want My Love" which was a hit for Coco Lee in New Zealand and Australia in 1999 making the top 20 in both countries.

2000s
Armsbury provided background vocals on Rosie O'Donnell's Another Rosie Christmas album which was released in 2000. She also did background vocal work for the Swedish group Play on their 2003 album, Playin' Around. In May 2007, she was a guest performer with Julia Wade in her Julia Wade in A Canvas of Colors show at the Laurie Beechman Theatre. She contributed a rap to the Everybody Get Down by Funk Filharmonik, which was released in 2008.

Activism
In 2000, Armsbury volunteered with the Shadow Convention of 2000. She performed with the children’s chorus who were the children orphaned as a result of parents being imprisoned in the war on drugs.

In 2001, Armsbury was the spokes-woman for the United Musicians Front, a 50-member group of musicians who were protesting against radio stations which included La Mega, who had  gone too far to the commercial side and lost touch with the people in New York.

In 2008, Armsbury came to the Southeast Missouri State University at the request of its musical director Judith Farris to speak to the students.  She shared with them her experience with cancer.

Death
Armsbury died in January 2009 of mesothelioma which was from exposure to asbestos.
In  2009, the Southeast Missouri State University's Department of Theatre and Dance and students dedicated their Sweet Charity musical production to Armsbury. A concert was held in her memory which was in conjunction with the Mesothelioma Applied Research Foundation.

Discography

References

External links
 Herencia Latina: JILLIAN: IN HER OWN WORDS By Eric E. González
 Herencia Latina:  Jillian, (1962 – 2009) Por Eric E. González
 Jazz Con Clave: Q&A: A Conversation With Johnny Almendra And Jillian by George Rivera
 La Salsa es mi Vida: Danzón, Johnny Almendra y Los Jóvenes del Barrio – Reconfirmando
 Onda Carolina: Jillian Armsbury (1962-2009): Pioneer of Charanga R&B

1962 births
2009 deaths
Deaths from mesothelioma
20th-century American singers
American women singer-songwriters
Latin jazz musicians
American rhythm and blues singer-songwriters
20th-century American women singers
21st-century American women singers
Shanachie Records artists
RMM Records artists